The Armenian Communist Party (ՀԿԿ; Hayastani Komunistakan Kusaktsutyun, HKK) is a communist party in Armenia. It considers itself the successor to the Armenian branch of the Communist Party of the Soviet Union. It is the main communist party in Armenia and claimed 18,000 (mostly elderly) members in 2006. HKK publishes Hayastani Komunist and Pravda Armenii.

It should not be confused with the historical Communist Party of Armenia during the Soviet era, nor the Democratic Party of Armenia, a party founded by the last secretary of the Communist Party of Armenia, Aram G. Sargsyan.

Leaders
The title of the party leader is First Secretary.
1991–1999: Sergey Badalyan
2000–2005: Vladimir Darbinyan
2005–2013: Ruben Tovmasyan
2013–: Tachat Sargsyan

Ideology

The party was described as "staunchly pro-Russian" by the US-funded Radio Free Europe/Radio Liberty in 2002. In a 1994 rally, the party called for "a new union with Russia", calling it Armenia's "only salvation." In 2011, party members marched through downtown Yerevan towards the square named after Stepan Shahumyan, an early Armenian communist revolutionary. They held banners reading “Socialism”, “Long Live the Communist Party of Armenia”, “Down with Capitalism”, and “Forever with Russia”. Its leader, Ruben Tovmasyan, stated: "History has proved that Armenia cannot live without Russia. The moment the Russian flag stops flying in Gyumri [a reference to Russian troops stationed in Armenia] Armenia will start moving towards its end as the enemy will be quick to attack us. The Communist Party of Armenia has always been in favor of consolidation among fraternal peoples." At a 2006 rally the slogan was "Down with America, Always with Russia."

In 2001, the party and several thousand supporters advocated Armenia's membership into the Union State of Russia and Belarus. They continued the campaign for Armenia's membership into the union with Russia and Belarus in 2002. The party supported the creation of the Eurasian Economic Union (EEU) and in 2013 welcomed Armenia's accession into the EEU as a "prelude to the restoration of the Soviet Union."

The party opposes any further European integration of Armenia.

The party's programme in 1999 included:
Armenia's transformation into a parliamentary republic
Rejection of Western-style market reforms 
Socialism which embraces a mixed economy, including private property
Close ties with Russia 
Nagorno-Karabakh's recognition as a subject of international law
Armenia's accession to the Union State (the party did not explicitly call for the recreation of the USSR)

The party supported the 2022 Russian invasion of Ukraine. It staged a demonstration in support of Russia's "special military operation" to "demilitarise and denazify" Ukraine on March 4.

Support base and election results

The party remained a significant political force in the 1990s under its charismatic leader Sergey Badalyan, who died in 1999. The party's 1994 May Day rally attracted some 10,000 to 60,000 supporters.

While it received only 12.4% of the vote in the July 1995 election, opinion polls both before and after the vote showed significantly more public support for the party. In a November 1994 poll, 40.1% of respondents backed the party and 37.6% did in a November 1995 poll.

In a 2004 For Official Use Only telegram on Armenian political parties, US Ambassador in Armenia John Ordway wrote that the party has "fewer than 50,000 members country-wide (most of them quite elderly)" and that it "is no longer especially influential."

The party has contested in every parliamentary election, but has failed to pass the 5% threshold since 2003. In 2003, the party accused the government of "mass falsifications." The party boycotted the 2018 Armenian parliamentary election for the first time since the collapse of the Soviet Union.

See also

Communist Party of Artsakh brother party in Artsakh.
Politics of Armenia
Programs of political parties in Armenia

References

1991 establishments in Armenia
Communist parties in Armenia
Communist parties in the Soviet Union
Political parties established in 1991
Political parties in Armenia
International Meeting of Communist and Workers Parties